Liang Kuo-shu (12 December 1930 – 31 July 1995) was a Taiwanese politician who served as the 14th Governor of the Central Bank of the Republic of China.

Biography
Born in Taichū Prefecture, Japanese Taiwan, Liang studied economics at the National Taiwan University, where he earned his master's degree. He then studied at Vanderbilt University in the United States, where he received a doctorate in economics, and went on to serve as a professor.

Liang worked as the chairman of various public banks for 19 years, starting in August 1975. Following the death of Hsieh Sam-chung in June 1994, he became the 14th governor of the Central Bank of the Republic of China. Liang's term lasted less than a year due to health problems, which lead him to resign in March 1995. He was succeeded by Sheu Yuan-dong and died four months after his resignation on July 31, 1995.

Family 

 Liang's father and paternal grandfather came from a wealthy family in Xiushui Township, Changhua County.
She formerly worked in the banking department of National Chengchi University and now serves as chairperson of the Far East Intercontinental Bank alongside vice chairperson

Legacy 
Following Liang's death, the National Taiwan University has held a memorial Symposium" every year since 1995 to discuss the direction of national development, economic and trade trends, international financial situations, economic development and other topics in memory of his alumni. When the University's new building of Social Sciences on the Gongguan campus was completed, the conference hall located in the centre of the building was named after Liang.

View of independence 
Independence activist Koo Kwang-ming recalls that during a discussion about Taiwan's future in Taipei in 1972, future president Lee Teng-hui said Taiwan would have a more promising future if the country achieved full independence, and Liang agreed.

References

External links 
 中央銀行全球資訊網 ─ 梁國樹 先生 (in Chinese)
 臺灣歷史辭典 梁國樹 (in Chinese)
 財經學者出仕圖 (in Chinese)
 侯金英的溫馨「接棒」情 (in Chinese)
 施振榮 從挫折中累積經驗 (in Chinese)
 金融研訓院董事長侯金英 軟硬體並進為人才奠基 (in Chinese)
 行政院研考會副主委任內事蹟 (in Chinese)
 彰化縣秀水鄉福安村梅鏡堂（棋官內）沿革介紹 (in Chinese)
 舊時代的新女性風采——侯金英 (in Chinese)
 全球資本主義的五大風險 (in Chinese)

1930 births
National Taiwan University alumni
Vanderbilt University alumni
Taiwanese bankers
Governors of the Central Bank of the Republic of China
1995 deaths